Wooly Mammoth was an American stoner metal band from Washington, D.C., United States.

Biography
Wooly Mammoth was formed in Washington, D.C. in October 2000 by guitarist/singer/songwriter Zac Eller (formerly of hardcore/punk bands Worlds Collide and Bluetip). They released their first EP, Ten Ton Baby in 2002. They made a name for themselves in their hometown of Washington, D.C. as the heaviest and loudest band in the city and received quite a bit of local and international press, including the Washington Post's reference to their "intergenerational tough peoples music" and the UK's Metal Hammer exclaiming "At times, this Washington, D.C. trio are so inspired, their music becomes the centre of the universe." They toured the mid-atlantic/midwest region extensively and made an appearance at the Emissions From The Monolith festival in Youngstown, Ohio. Back home the band recorded two songs "The Prophet" and "Mastercut And Charisma" for their 2004 split release with The Hidden Hand. They recorded their debut album, The Temporary Nature, in 2006. It was produced by The Hidden Hand bassist Bruce Falkinburg. Hidden Hand guitarist Wino appears on the track "Mammoth Bones". In 2007 Kyle Connolly left the band and was replaced by Jason Daniloski, formerly of Meatjack. The new line up brought about a heavier more stripped down approach to the music and resulted in a slew of progressive new material that was never published. The band broke up in 2009.

Members
Zac Eller - guitar & vocals
Jason Daniloski - bass & backing vocals
Phil Adler - drums

Discography

Albums
The Temporary Nature - Underdogma Records 2006

EPs and split releases
Night Letters split w/The Hidden Hand - MeteorCity Records/McCarthyism Records 2004
Ten Ton Baby - Underdogma Records 2002

References

External links
Official website

Musical groups established in 2000
American stoner rock musical groups
Rock music groups from Washington, D.C.
Heavy metal musical groups from Washington, D.C.